The 1998 Elite League speedway season was the 64th season of the top tier of speedway in the United Kingdom and the second year known as the Elite League, governed by the Speedway Control Board (SCB) in conjunction with the British Speedway Promoters' Association (BSPA).

Summary
In 1998, the league decreased to nine teams with the closure of the Bradford Dukes at the end of their championship winning season in 1997. The Peterborough Panthers dropped down to the Premier League but were replaced by the Oxford Cheetahs. The league operated on a standard format without play-offs.

Ipswich Witches won the league (their first since 1984) and cup double and were led by the world's leading rider Tony Rickardsson. Rickardsson topped the averages for the second consecutive season and was well supported by Pole Tomasz Gollob in his maiden British season. English riders Chris Louis and Scott Nicholls added even more strength and became British Champion and British Under-21 Champion respectively during the season.

Final table

Elite League Knockout Cup
The 1998 Speedway Star Knockout Cup was the 60th edition of the Knockout Cup for tier one teams and the second under its new name. Ipswich Witches were the winners of the competition.

First round

Group A

Group B

Semi-finals

Final

The first leg was due to be held on 9 October at Foxhall Stadium but was abandoned after 5 heats due to heavy rain. Coventry were leading 17-13 at the time.

First leg

Second leg

Ipswich were declared Knockout Cup Champions, winning on aggregate 95-85.

Leading final averages

Riders & final averages
Belle Vue

 9.02
 8.99
 7.50
 6.00
 5.83
	5.57
 5.25
 4.87
 4.00
 2.24

Coventry

 10.07
 9.58 
 7.67
 5.63
 4.44
 3.42
 3.19

Eastbourne

 8.70
 7.33
 7.15
 6.86
 6.59
 6.32 
 6.00
S 2.82
 2.36

Ipswich

 10.35
 9.38
 9.35
 6.41
 4.98
 4.19

King's Lynn

 6.81
 6.64 
 5.80
 5.59
 5.53
	5.09
 4.72
 2.78

Oxford

 9.54
 6.80
 6.31
 6.18
 5.87
 5.27
 3.48

Poole

 8.17
 7.59
 7.12
 6.40
 5.56
 5.46
 5.25
 4.61

Swindon

 8.53 
 8.32 
 7.55 
 6.93
 6.27
 4.78
 3.37

Wolverhampton

 8.53
 8.02
 7.42
 6.23
 4.73
 3.77
 3.65

See also
List of United Kingdom Speedway League Champions
Knockout Cup (speedway)

References

SGB Premiership
1998 in British motorsport